Elliot Lake Municipal Airport  is a registered aerodrome located  southeast of the city of Elliot Lake, Ontario, Canada.

Facilities

The airport consists of a small brick single storey terminal building. Other than a small waiting area there are no other services inside. Food is available for pilots only.

To the west of the terminal are storage sheds and hangars for general aviation aircraft.

Tenants
There are no schedule airlines operating to and from this airport, but facilities exists to handle them.

Current tenants include:

 Air Bravo – air ambulance operator based in Blind River, Ontario; flies to and from Elliot Lake
 Mining company transport – two flights transport to Red Lake every two weeks
 Dynamex – logistics and freight services operator flies to and from Elliot Lake on contracts to clients in the area
 Private flight for an ear/nose/throat specialist who flies into Elliot Lake once a week
 Hope Air – provides free medical transport to those in need in the area

The closest airports with scheduled passenger services are Sault Ste. Marie Airport and Greater Sudbury Airport.

Technical information

General
 Magnetic Variation: 9° west

The aerodrome is operated by the City of Elliot Lake and is registered by Transport Canada.

Runways
 Runway 12/30: , paved, lighted, PAPI type 2 approach lighting at both ends

Communications
 Unicom/ATF: Elliot Lake Unicom/Traffic 123.0 MHz
 PAL: Toronto Centre 135.4 MHz

Navigation aid
 NDB: Elliot Lake (YEL), 276 kHz,  123° to airport. As of recently (2022) however, the NDB has been decommissioned.

References

External links
 Airport website

Transport in Elliot Lake
Registered aerodromes in Algoma District
Buildings and structures in Elliot Lake